Berdeen Lake is located in North Cascades National Park, in the U. S. state of Washington.

References

Lakes of Washington (state)
North Cascades National Park
Lakes of Whatcom County, Washington